National Highway 139 (NH 139) is a National Highway in India within the states of Bihar and Jharkhand. This  highway passes through Arwal, Daudnagar and Aurangabad.

Junctions list

 Bihar

  Terminal at Patna

See also 
 List of National Highways in India
 List of National Highways in India (by Highway Number)
 National Highways Development Project
 Transport in Bihar

References 

139
139
National highways in India